The Big Picture is 1989 American comedy film starring Kevin Bacon and directed by Christopher Guest in his directorial debut.

Plot
Film student and would-be writer/director Nick Chapman, an Ohio native, finds himself the winner of a prestigious student film contest in LA. Overnight, Hollywood VIPs want to make deals with Nick. He settles on a quirky agent to represent him, and signs a deal with a major film studio to make his dream movie.

Nick finds the Hollywood studio "process" distasteful, and is forced to make many creative compromises, but he now has money and meets fast, new Hollywood friends. Likewise, the now-affected Nick throws old friends overboard, as his instant success crowds out his old relationships, including that with his girlfriend, Susan.

Nick's new world is suddenly turned upside down again when a new studio head decides to cancel his film project. Unable to strike any new film deals, college educated Nick is reduced to unskilled positions like moving man, telemarketer, and message delivery man.  His life is re-enacted in film parts.

Ultimately, a humbled and repentant Nick reunites with old friends and, with Susan, carves an unexpected path to getting his film produced, this time on his terms.

Cast

In addition, Martin Short has a significant uncredited role as Neil Sussman, Chapman's agent, appearing multiple times, with plot developments.

The film features numerous, cameo, "Special Appearances":

Release
Greenlit by David Puttnam, president of Columbia Pictures, who was ousted two weeks after production began.  According to Guest, the subsequent regime at the studio was  unable to figure out what could be done with the film, as many executives at the studio didn't like the film because they felt like they were being brutally satirized in it. Columbia quietly gave The Big Picture a limited theatrical release (despite opening to positive reviews) before sending it to video.

Reception
The Big Picture received positive reviews from critics, as it holds an 88% rating on Rotten Tomatoes based on 24 reviews with the consensus: "The Big Picture aims at targets that might not be familiar to viewers who aren't well-versed in movie-biz chicanery, but hits most of them so solidly that laughter is the only option."

References

External links

1989 films
1989 comedy films
1989 independent films
American comedy films
American independent films
Columbia Pictures films
Films about filmmaking
Films about Hollywood, Los Angeles
Films directed by Christopher Guest
Films with screenplays by Christopher Guest
Films with screenplays by Michael Varhol
Films with screenplays by Michael McKean
1989 directorial debut films
Films about screenwriters
Films about film directors and producers
1980s English-language films
1980s American films